SunView (Sun Visual Integrated Environment for Workstations, originally SunTools) is a discontinued windowing system from Sun Microsystems that was included as part of its UNIX implementation starting in 1983. Unlike later UNIX windowing systems, much of it was implemented in the system kernel. SunView ran on Sun's desktop and deskside workstations, providing an interactive graphical environment for technical computing, document publishing, medical, and other applications of the 1980s, on high resolution monochrome, greyscale and color displays.

Bundled productivity applications 

SunView includes a full suite of productivity applications, including an email reader, calendaring tool, text editor, clock, preferences, and menu management interface (all GUIs). The idea of shipping such clients and the associated server software with the base OS was several years ahead of the rest of the industry.

Sun's original SunView application suite was later ported to X, featuring the OPEN LOOK look and feel.  Known as the DeskSet productivity tool set, this was one distinguishing element of Sun's OpenWindows desktop environment.

The DeskSet tools became a unifying element at the end of the Unix wars, where the open systems industry was embroiled in a battle which would last for years.  As part of the COSE initiative, it was decided that Sun's bundled applications would be ported yet again, this time to the Motif widget toolkit, and the result would be part of CDE. This became the standard for a time across all open systems vendors.

The full suite of group productivity applications that Sun had bundled with the desktop workstations turned out to be a significant legacy of SunView. While the underlying windowing infrastructure changed, protocols changed, and windowing systems changed, the Sun applications remained largely the same, maintaining interoperability with previous implementations.

Successors
SunView was intended to be superseded by NeWS, a more sophisticated window system based on PostScript; however, the actual successor turned out to be OpenWindows, whose window server supported SunView, NeWS and the X Window System. Support for the display of SunView programs was phased out after Solaris 2.2. Sun provided a toolkit for X called XView, with an API similar to that of SunView, simplifying the transition for developers between the two environments.

Sun later announced its migration to the GNOME desktop environment from CDE, presumably marking the end of the 20-year-plus history of the SunView/DeskSet code base.

References

Sun Microsystems software
Windowing systems
Widget toolkits